Adam Tomlinson (born 10 August 1993) is a professional Australian rules footballer playing for the Melbourne Football Club in the Australian Football League (AFL). He was recruited by Greater Western Sydney with their seventh selection and ninth overall in the 2011 national draft. He made his debut in the sixty-three-point loss against  at ANZ Stadium in Greater Western Sydney's inaugural match in round one.

In his second season, he was the round 17 nominee for the AFL Rising Star where he recorded twenty-three disposals, nine marks, four tackles and a goal in the thirty-nine-point loss against  at Škoda Stadium. He was educated at Trinity Grammar School in Kew, Victoria.

Tomlinson had to wait until round 19, 2013, to experience his first win in an AFL match, when the Greater Western Sydney Giants defeated  by 37 points. His 21 match-wait for a maiden win is currently the longest of any current player in the AFL.

At the conclusion of the 2019 AFL season, following his first grand final appearance, Tomlinson moved to Melbourne as a free agent.

Tomlinson currently studies a Bachelor of Property and Real Estate/Bachelor of Commerce at Deakin University.

Statistics
Updated to the end of the 2022 season.

|-
| 2012 ||  || 20
| 9 || 2 || 1 || 56 || 43 || 99 || 31 || 16 || 0.2 || 0.1 || 6.2 || 4.8 || 11.0 || 3.4 || 1.8
|-
| 2013 ||  || 20
| 17 || 5 || 6 || 179 || 89 || 268 || 127 || 27 || 0.3 || 0.4 || 6.6 || 5.2 || 11.8 || 7.5 || 1.6
|-
| 2014 ||  || 20
| 19 || 8 || 6 || 181 || 126 || 307 || 127 || 47 || 0.4 || 0.3 || 9.5 || 6.7 || 16.2 || 6.7 || 2.5
|-
| 2015 ||  || 20
| 8 || 2 || 3 || 70 || 40 || 110 || 50 || 13 || 0.3 || 0.4 || 8.8 || 5.0 || 13.8 || 6.3 || 1.6
|-
| 2016 ||  || 20
| 14 || 1 || 3 || 110 || 70 || 180 || 66 || 21 || 0.1 || 0.2 || 7.9 || 5.0 || 12.9 || 4.7 || 1.5
|-
| 2017 ||  || 20
| 24 || 1 || 0 || 227 || 103 || 330 || 119 || 39 || 0.0 || 0.0 || 9.5 || 4.3 || 13.8 || 5.0 || 1.6
|-
| 2018 ||  || 20
| 24 || 12 || 4 || 255 || 144 || 399 || 129 || 63 || 0.5 || 0.2 || 10.6 || 6.0 || 16.6 || 5.4 || 2.6
|-
| 2019 ||  || 20
| 25 || 4 || 3 || 274 || 151 || 425 || 155 || 64 || 0.2 || 0.1 || 11.0 || 6.0 || 17.0 || 6.2 || 2.6
|-
| 2020 ||  || 20
| 13 || 0 || 1 || 106 || 56 || 162 || 56 || 22 || 0.0 || 0.1 || 8.2 || 4.3 || 12.5 || 4.3 || 1.7
|-
| 2021 ||  || 20
| 7 || 0 || 0 || 61 || 23 || 84 || 38 || 9 || 0.0 || 0.0 || 8.7 || 3.3 || 12.0 || 5.4 || 1.3
|-
| 2022 ||  || 20
| 8 || 0 || 0 || 61 || 26 || 87 || 38 || 7 || 0.0 || 0.0 || 7.6 || 3.3 || 10.9 || 4.8 || 0.9
|- class=sortbottom
! colspan=3 | Career
! 168 !! 35 !! 27 !! 1580 !! 871 !! 2451 !! 936 !! 328 !! 0.2 !! 0.2 !! 9.4 !! 5.2 !! 14.6 !! 5.6 !! 2.0
|}

Notes

References

External links

 
 

1993 births
Living people
Greater Western Sydney Giants players
Oakleigh Chargers players
Australian rules footballers from Victoria (Australia)
People educated at Trinity Grammar School, Kew
Melbourne Football Club players